The Girl from the Marsh Croft is a 1935 German drama film directed by Detlef Sierck and starring Hansi Knoteck, Ellen Frank and Eduard von Winterstein. It was adapted from the 1908 novel The Girl from the Marsh Croft by Selma Lagerlöf. It has been described as a "prototype Heimatfilm. It was remade in 1958.

The film's sets were designed by the art director Carl Ludwig Kirmse. Location shooting took place on the Teufelsmoor north of Bremen.

Synopsis
Young farmer Karsten travels to town to select a maid to help his mother on their family farm. He is unimpressed by any of the girls offering their services, but is won over by Helga, an impoverished girl he sees in the town courthouse. She has filed a paternity suit against a farmer who fathered her illegitimate child, but when the farmer prepares to falsely swear on a Bible that he is not the father, she withdraws her suit, saying she would rather her child have no legal father than a father who would falsely swear in court. Karsten is impressed by her courage and offers her the job on his farm.

Karsten's fiancee, Gertrud, is not pleased when she sees how friendly he is with his pretty new maid. Gertrud is the daughter of the town bailiff. She is wealthier than Karsten, so it is a socially advantageous match for Karsten's family. Gertrud becomes jealous of Helga and finally demands that Karsten fire Helga. He refuses, but his mother talks Helga into going home, for the good of Karsten's whole family. When Karsten learns this, he is furious. He finds Helga and takes her with him to church, shocking the townsfolk.

Gertrud demands that Karsten choose between her and the maid. Unable to choose, Karsten gets blind drunk with friends on his wedding night and wakes up the next day to hear a man was murdered at the bar he was carousing at. Karsten believes he is the killer, because the victim had a broken half of a knife in his corpse, and Karsten's knife is mysteriously broken. He goes to the wedding ceremony and calls it off, saying he intends to turn himself in to the police.

When Helga is informed of this, she is horrified, because she broke his knife without telling him, so she knows he's innocent. She races to Karsten's house, where she finds Gertrud. Helga tells Gertrud to go to Karsten and hide the fact that she knows he's innocent, and tell him she will stand by him no matter what. Meanwhile, Helga will go to the authorities and clear Karsten.

Gertrud realizes that Helga loves Karsten so much that she cares more about his happiness than her own. Gertrud goes to Karsten, but cannot bring herself to lie. Instead, she reveals everything to Karsten and calls off the wedding, telling him to go to Helga. Karsten finds Helga and they agree to marry.

Release dates and different film titles 
The film premiered in Germany in Berlin on October 30, 1935. It was published in France under the title La fille des marais, in Italy under the title La ragazza di Moorhof and in the USA under the title The Girl from the Marsh Croft or The Girl of the Moors. The film was first broadcast on German television on May 3, 1988 on ZDF.

Cast

References

Bibliography

External links

1935 films
German drama films
1930s German-language films
Films directed by Douglas Sirk
Films based on Swedish novels
Films based on works by Selma Lagerlöf
Films of Nazi Germany
1935 drama films
UFA GmbH films
German black-and-white films
1930s German films